Hornea may refer to:
 Hornea (plant), a genus of plants in the family Sapindaceae 
 Hornea, a genus of reptiles in the family Elapidae, synonym of Simoselaps
 Hornea, an extinct genus of plants in the family Horneophytaceae, synonym of Horneophyton